Belén Asensio (born December 21, 1976) is a female taekwondo practitioner from Spain.

She won the gold medal in the finweight (-47 kg) class at the 1999 World Taekwondo Championships in Edmonton, Alberta, Canada.  Asensio won the gold medal again in finweight at the 2005 World Taekwondo Championships in Madrid, defeating Sümeyye Gülec of Germany 4-2 in the semifinal and You Eun-Young of South Korea 4-1 in the final.

She is also a two-time European Champion in 2000 and 2006. However, she has not qualified for any of the past three Olympics (2000, 2004 and 2008), losing her spot for the 2004 and 2008 Olympics to Spanish rival Brigitte Yagüe at the Spanish Olympic trials.

References
the-sports.org

External links

1976 births
Spanish female taekwondo practitioners
Living people
World Taekwondo Championships medalists
European Taekwondo Championships medalists
20th-century Spanish women
21st-century Spanish women